Bruce Robert Blair (born 27 December 1957) is a New Zealand former cricketer who played first-class cricket for Otago and Northern Districts between 1977 and 1990. He played 14 One Day Internationals for the New Zealand national cricket team in the mid-1980s. He coached Northern Districts from 2001 to 2006 and was later a coaching services advisor at the New Zealand Academy of Sport in Hamilton. He was a select for both Northern Districts and Central Districts.

Blair was born at Dunedin and educated at Otago Boys High School. His older brother, Wayne, played first-class cricket for Otago from 1967 to 1991.

References

1957 births
Living people
New Zealand cricketers
New Zealand One Day International cricketers
Otago cricketers
Northern Districts cricketers
South Island cricketers